The top level of competition in the Irish rugby union system is the Pro14 (currently known for sponsorship purposes as the Guinness Pro14), a league of professional teams originally from Ireland, Scotland, and Wales that expanded to include two Italian teams in the 2010–11 season and two South African teams in the 2017–18 season. Ireland currently has four entries in the Pro14. Ireland also has a domestic competition the All Ireland League and Provincial Leagues run by the different provincial branches of the Irish Rugby Football Union (IRFU).

Pro14
The league now known as the Pro14 was created in 2001 as the Celtic League with 15 teams from the Celtic nations—the four Irish provinces, teams from both of Scotland's largest cities, and all nine teams from the Welsh Premier Division. After the first season, a third Scottish team, representing the Borders region, joined. The league saw radical change for the 2003–04 season, as the Welsh Rugby Union adopted a controversial plan to regionalise the country's professional rugby setup. The existing professional clubs were reorganised into five regional sides and the Welsh Premier Division was demoted to a developmental league. One of the original Welsh regional teams was folded after that season, resulting in an 11-team league.

In 2006, the competition became the Magners League via a sponsorship deal with Irish cider maker Magners. After the 2006–07 season, the Scottish Rugby Union folded the Borders side for financial reasons, leaving the league with  10 members. The league expanded to include two Italian super-regional franchises starting with the 2010–11 season, which proved to be the last under Magners sponsorship. The league found a new sponsor in RaboDirect, the Irish subsidiary of Dutch financial services company Rabobank.

Since its inception, the Celtic League/Pro12 has been a closed league with no promotion or relegation. Under current rules, the three Irish teams that finish highest in the league receive berths in the following season's Heineken Cup, with the remaining provincial side taking part in the European Challenge Cup. Starting with the 2009–10 season, the winners of both European cups have earned berths in the following season's Heineken Cup separately from their countries' normal allocations. From the inception of the Celtic League through the 2010–11 season, the three traditional provincial powers of Leinster, Munster and Ulster claimed all of Ireland's Heineken Cup places, leaving Connacht to carry the country's banner in the Challenge Cup. In 2011–12, all four of Ireland's provinces competed in the Heineken Cup; Leinster's victory in the 2011 Heineken Cup Final gave Ireland a fourth Heineken Cup berth, which passed to Connacht as Leinster were already qualified via the Celtic League.

All Ireland League
The main domestic league in Ireland is the All Ireland League. This was started in 1990 and has now expanded to three divisions with a total of 52 senior clubs.

The champion of Division 1A and of the All Ireland League is decided by a set of playoffs played at the conclusion of the 18 game regular season. The winner of this set of playoffs becomes All Ireland League champions for that season.

The bottom club in Division One A IS relegated to Division One B to be replaced by the top club from Division One B with second bottom in Division One A playing off against second in Division One B. The bottom two from Division One B are replaced by the top two from Division Two A. The bottom two teams in Division Two A are relegated to Division Two B and third bottom in Division Two A plays off against third in Division Two B. The bottom club in Division Two B is relegated to the top division of junior rugby in their division while the team that finishes second bottom in Division Two B playoffs off against the team that finishes second in the round robin competition between the winners of the four provincial junior leagues

See also
 Rugby union in Ireland

References 

Sports league systems